John Harold Greig was Bishop of Gibraltar then Guildford in the first half of the 20th century. He was born on 13 February 1865  and educated at Pembroke College, Cambridge. He was ordained deacon in 1888  and priest a year later. After a curacy at St Bartholomew's, Sydenham he was  Wilberforce Missioner in South London then Vicar of St Paul's, Lorrimore Square; and later became Archdeacon of Worcester before his elevation to the episcopate. He was consecrated a bishop by Randall Davidson, Archbishop of Canterbury, on the Feast of the Conversion of St Paul 1921 (25 January) at Westminster Abbey. He died on 28 March 1938.

Notes

1865 births
Alumni of Pembroke College, Cambridge
Archdeacons of Worcester
20th-century Anglican bishops of Gibraltar
Bishops of Guildford
1938 deaths